Paul Antoine Brunel (12 March 1830 – 1904) was a French general.

1830 births
1904 deaths
French generals
French socialists